Vishnupalita Kambhoja   (Kumara Kanbhoja Vhenupalita in Mhar (Mahad) inscriptions) finds reference in the Buddhist inscriptions (today known as Gandharpale caves situated near confluence of Gandhari & savitri rivers) found at Mhar or Mahad in Kolaba district of Maharashtra, in Bombay Presidency. Kanbhoja of the inscriptions is same as the Kambhoja or Kamboja of ancient Sanskrit and Pali texts and of king Asoka’s Rock Edicts. The prince is believed to have ruled in Kolaba (near Bombay), probably around the 2nd century CE.

Inscriptions
Inscriptions and charters belonging to the Bhoja rulers, dating to the 5th century, executed by Nidhivara and written by Buddhadasa of the Kamboja have been found in Bandora, Goa.

Luders's inscriptions No 176 and 472 refer to the gift of a monk Kaboja Kamboja) from Nandi-Nagara made at Sanchi Buddghist Stupa. According to IHQ:  "The monk was a Kamboja of Nandi-Nagara which might have been a place in the neighborhood of Sanchi". But no evidence of any ancient place called Nandi-Nagara near Sanchi (in Malawa) is attested. Probably the Nandi Nagara of the Sanchi Inscriptions refers to modern Nandode (Rajpipli) in Gujarat which in earlier was known as Nandan Nagar or Nandi-puri.

See also
Raigad district

References

Further reading

 The Journal of the International Association of Buddhist Studies, 2000,  International Association of Buddhist Studies

Monastery and Guild: Commerce Under the Sātavāhanas, 1986,  Himanshu Prabha Ray
Journal of the Asiatic Society of Bombay, 1974,  Asiatic Society of Bombay
The Cultural History of Goa from 10000 B.C.-1352 A.D., 1986, Anant Ramkrishna Sinai Dhume - Goa, Daman and Diu (India)

Kambojas
2nd-century Indian monarchs